North African theatre may refer to:

North African Theatre:
Egyptian Theatre
Tunisian Theatre
North African theatre (World War I)
North African theatre (World War II)